Solakzade Mehmed (1592–1658), using the pen name Hemdemi, was an Ottoman historian and music composer. He wrote a famous Ottoman history titled Tarih-i Solakzade (History of Solakzade). He seems to have been the son of a Solak, a janissary bowman of the sultan's personal guard, and was born in Constantinople.

References

17th-century historians from the Ottoman Empire
Musicians from the Ottoman Empire